Sean Pomper is a creator/ inventor who came to light in the early 2000s with his Invention of Flavor Spray.  Flavor Spray was an alternative Food Spray for fattening unwanted calories.  Just "Spray" on flavor. Invented by Sean Pomper and celebrity chef David Burke, Flavor Spray landed into Time Magazine's 2005 Most Amazing Inventions.

Sean Pomper then created the cult classic film Reality Horror Night starring some of Hollywoods memorable Reality Stars like Erik Chopin, Destiney as well as celebrities like Joseph Gannascoli, Gina Lynn and Matthew Underwood from Zoey 101.

His next film Killer Hoo-Ha was actually named from Fangoria magazine.

Sean Pomper also invented "The Diet Fork" and created the Ice Cream Franchise Nitro. Nitro makes Ice Cream using Liquid Nitrogen.

References

American inventors
Living people
Year of birth missing (living people)
Place of birth missing (living people)